The Venetian Province was the name of the territory of the former Republic of Venice ceded by the French First Republic to the Habsburg monarchy under the terms of the 1797 Treaty of Campo Formio that ended the War of the First Coalition. The province's capital was Venice.

In the course of the French Italian campaign of 1796, the Signoria of Venice under Doge Ludovico Manin had rejected an alliance with Napoleon, whereupon Bonaparte occupied the city on 14 May 1797, leading to the Fall of the Republic of Venice. In exchange for renouncing all rights to the Southern Netherlands and recognizing the French Cisalpine Republic, Emperor Francis II of Habsburg gained the conquered Venetian territory including the Dalmatian coast, except for the Ionian Islands.

Replacing the long lasting Republic of Venice, this new Province of Venice was incorporated as a separate part of the Austrian archduchy, where Francis took the additional title of "Duke of Venice". It was, however, not subject to the Holy Roman Empire. The province was directed by an Austrian governor, but continued to use former Venetian legislation and maintained its currency, the Venetian lira. The western border of the province was shifted in favour of the Cisalpine Republic by the 1801 Treaty of Lunéville, and drawn up along the thalweg of the lower Adige river.

Unlike the previous 1,100-year-old republic, the province did not have a long existence. After the Grande Armée had defeated the forces of the Austrian Empire at Austerlitz, Francis, as per the 1805 Treaty of Pressburg, had to cede the Venetian territory to the Napoleonic Kingdom of Italy. In 1815, it was returned to Austria under the terms of the Final Act of the Congress of Vienna and became part of the crown land of Lombardy–Venetia.

References

Austrian Empire
History of Veneto
States and territories established in 1797
States and territories disestablished in 1805
1797 establishments in the Habsburg monarchy
1805 disestablishments in the Austrian Empire